Jogezai (Pashto: جوګيزئ‌ , Urdu: جوگیزئی) is a Pashtun tribe of Pakistan. It is a subtribe of Sanzarkhail, Kakar. The majority of the Jogezai tribesmen live in Killa Saifullah and Loralai. The current Nawab of Pashtuns is from Jogezai tribe namely, Nawab Muhammad Ayaz Khan Jogezai, who is the bloodline of Baiker Nika. 

In the middle of the 18th century Ahmed Shah Abdali granted a sanad (certificate) to Baiker Nika, fourth in descent from Jogi and the head of the Jogezai family, conferring upon him the title and position of "Badshah or Ruler of Zhob". The Zhob Tumandar belongs to the Jogezai family. 

The application of the British policy of Divide and Rule resulted into splitting and division of the Jogezai family into three different heads of one tribe. One of the leaders was given the titles of Tumandar, Sardar Bahadur and Nawab (S.B Tumandar Nawab Bangul Khan Jogezai) and the other two were given the title of Sardar Bahadur; (Sardar Bahadur Zarghun Khan Jogezai of Killa Saifullah) and (Sardar Bahadur Akbar Khan Jogezai of Loralai).

Nawab of Jogezai 
The first Nawab from the Jogezai clan was Shaheed Nawab Bangul Khan Jogezai, who was first awarded the title of Sardar Bahadur in 1897 and later on, was granted the title of Nawab in 1906. After passing away in 1906, Nawab Bangul Khan was succeeded by his son, Nawab Mohammad Khan Jogezai. Nawab Mohammad Khan was a close ally of Muhammad Ali Jinnah and rendered great services to the Pakistan Movement and was the head of the Shahi Jirga of Balochistan. He was also a member of the Constituent Assembly of Pakistan from Balochistan (1947-1954). The third Nawab was Nawab Taimoor Shah Jogezai who also remained a member of the Provincial Assembly of Balochistan and was a Provincial Minister. He nominated his eldest grandson Nawab Mohammad Ayaz Jogezai to be his successor while he was still alive and after his death in 1988, Nawab Ayaz took over and is the current head of the family.

List of Nawabs 

Nawab Bangul Khan Jogezai
Nawab Mohammad Khan Jogezai
Nawab Taimoor Shah Jogezai
Nawab Muhammad Ayaz Khan Jogezai

Notable Personalities 

Other notable personalities include:
Sardar Dr Nasser u din Jogezai, [federal minister and senator of pakistan]

Nawabzada Jehangir Shah Jogezai, Member of Senate of Pakistan.

Sardar Wazir Ahmed Jogezai, Deputy Speaker of National Assembly of Pakistan.

Sardar Gul Muhammad Khan Jogezai, 11th Governor of Balochistan.

Sardar Muhammad Usman Khan Jogezai, Sardar and important member of the Pakistan Movement in Baluchistan

Sardar Ali Ahmed Jogezai, Sardar and Local Businessman.

References 

Pashtun tribes